The 2014–15 Liberty Flames basketball team represented Liberty University during the 2014–15 NCAA Division I men's basketball season. The Flames, led by sixth year head coach Dale Layer, played their home games at the Vines Center as members of the Big South Conference. They finished the season 8–24, 2–16 in Big South play to finish in last place. They lost in the first round of the Big South tournament to UNC Asheville.

At the end of the season, head coach Dale Layer was fired. He had a record of 82–113 and one NCAA tournament appearance in six seasons.

Roster

Schedule and results

|-
! colspan="9" style="background:#0a254e; color:#fff;"| Regular season

|-
! colspan="9" style="background:#0a254e; color:#fff;"|Big South tournament

References

Liberty Flames basketball seasons
Liberty
Liberty Flames bask
Liberty Flames bask